Mainamoti Medical College is a private medical college in Baropara, Comilla, Bangladesh. It is under the Chittagong Medical University.It is one of the largest and renowned private medical colleges in Cumilla.

History 
The college was established on 21 February in 2011. It was fined 10 million taka in November 2016 by Bangladesh High Court for admitting students that did not meet the admission requirements for medical college set by health ministry.

See also
List of Educational Institutions in Comilla

References 

Medical colleges in Bangladesh
Hospitals in Bangladesh
2011 establishments in Bangladesh
Educational institutions established in 2011